This list of gastropods described in 2014 is a list of new taxa of snails and slugs of every kind that have been described (following the rules of the ICZN) during the year 2014. For changes in taxonomy above the level of genus, see Changes in the taxonomy of gastropods since 2005.

Fossil gastropods

Marine gastropods

New species

Vetigastropoda

Arxellia boucheti Vilvens, Williams & Herbert, 2014
Arxellia erythrea Vilvens, Williams & Herbert, 2014
Arxellia helicoides Vilvens, Williams & Herbert, 2014
Arxellia herosae Vilvens, Williams & Herbert, 2014
Arxellia maestratii Vilvens, Williams & Herbert, 2014
Arxellia thaumasta Vilvens, Williams & Herbert, 2014
Arxellia tracheia Vilvens, Williams & Herbert, 2014
Arxellia trochos Vilvens, Williams & Herbert, 2014
Basilissopsis bassa Lima, Christoffersen & Villacampa, 2014
Bothropoma mediocarinata Reich & Wesselingh, 2014 † - accepted as Bothropoma mediocarinatum Reich & Wesselingh, 2014 †
Calliostoma aikeni Lussi, 2014
Calliostoma basulense Poppe, Tagaro & Vilvens, 2014
Calliostoma connyae Poppe, Tagaro & Vilvens, 2014
Calliostoma escondidum Poppe, Tagaro & Vilvens, 2014
Calliostoma haapaiense Vilvens, 2014
Calliostoma hematomenon Vilvens, 2014
Calliostoma herberti Vilvens, 2014
Calliostoma madatechnema Vilvens, 2014
Calliostoma mesemorinon Vilvens, 2014
Calliostoma parvajuba Vilvens, 2014
Calliostoma polysarkon Vilvens, 2014
Calliostoma pyrron Vilvens, 2014
Calliostoma subalboroseum Vilvens, 2014
Calliostoma textor Vilvens, 2014
Calliostoma tumidosolidum Vilvens, 2014
Calliostoma vaubanoides Vilvens, 2014
Calliotropis (Adamsenida) chunfuleei Chino, 2014 - represented as  Calliotropis chunfuleei Chino, 2014
Calliotropis arenosa Helwerda, Wesselingh & S. T. Williams, 2014 †
Carinastele wareni Vilvens, 2014
Clanculus nexus Bozzetti, 2014
Cornisepta aninga Simone & Cunha, 2014
Cornisepta arrepiata Simone & Cunha, 2014
Cornisepta uirapa Simone & Cunha, 2014
Cranopsis alaris Simone & Cunha, 2014
Cranopsis apostrema Simone & Cunha, 2014
Cranopsis canopa Simone & Cunha, 2014
Cranopsis cearensis Simone & Cunha, 2014
Cranopisis columbaris Simone & Cunha, 2014
Cranopsis enigmatica Simone & Cunha, 2014
Cranopsis hycavis Simone & Cunha, 2014
Cranopsis nymphalis Simone & Cunha, 2014
Crosseola gorii Rubio & Rolán, 2014
Emarginula suspira Simone & Cunha, 2014
Emarginula icosisculpta Simone & Cunha, 2014
Ethminolia wareni Helwerda, Wesselingh & S. T. Williams, 2014 †
Falsamotrochus angulatus Gründel & Hostettler, 2014 †
Halystina conoidea Helwerda, Wesselingh & S. T. Williams, 2014 †
Halystina umberlee Salvador, Cavallari & Simone, 2014
Haliotis geigeri Owen, 2014
Hemimarginula hemitoma Simone & Cunha, 2014
Homalopoma albobrunneum Bozzetti, 2014
Jujubinus eleonorae Smriglio, Di Giulio & Mariottini, 2014
Jujubinus trilloi Smriglio, Di Giulio & Mariottini, 2014
Manganesepta atiaia Simone & Cunha, 2014
Notocrater christofferseni Lima, 2014
Profundisepta denudata Simone & Cunha, 2014
Puncturella volcano Simone & Cunha, 2014
Rasatomaria gentilii Pieroni & Nützel, 2014 †
Rimula leptarcis Simone & Cunha, 2014
Seguenzia triteia Salvador, Cavallari & Simone, 2014
Zeidora crepidula Simone & Cunha, 2014
Zeidora geigeri Helwerda & Wesselingh, 2014 †
Zeidora pussa Simone & Cunha, 2014

Littorinimorpha
Aenigmula criscionei Golding, 2014
Alvania aliceae Amati, 2014
Alvania maximilicutiani Scuderi, 2014
Alvania nihonkaiensis Hasegawa, 2014
Alvania yamatoensis Hasegawa, 2014
Arganiella tabanensis Boeters, Glöer & Pešić, 2014
Anticlimax aitormonzoni Rubio & Rolán, 2014
Anticlimax bicarinata Rubio & Rolán, 2014
Anticlimax bicornis Rubio & Rolán, 2014
Anticlimax boucheti Rubio & Rolán, 2014
Anticlimax cyclist Rubio & Rolán, 2014
Anticlimax dentata Rubio & Rolán, 2014
Anticlimax discus Rubio & Rolán, 2014
Anticlimax elata Rubio & Rolán, 2014
Anticlimax fastigata Rubio & Rolán, 2014
Anticlimax faviformis Rubio & Rolán, 2014
Anticlimax fecunda Rubio & Rolán, 2014
Anticlimax fijiensis Rubio & Rolán, 2014
Anticlimax globulus Rubio & Rolán, 2014
Anticlimax imitatrix Rubio & Rolán, 2014
Anticlimax infaceta Rubio & Rolán, 2014
Anticlimax juanae Rubio & Rolán, 2014
Anticlimax lentiformis Rubio & Rolán, 2014
Anticlimax levis Rubio & Rolán, 2014
Anticlimax maestratii Rubio & Rolán, 2014
Anticlimax maranii Rubio & Rolán, 2014
Anticlimax obesa Rubio & Rolán, 2014
Anticlimax philippinensis Rubio & Rolán, 2014
Anticlimax philsmithi Rubio & Rolán, 2014
Anticlimax puncticulata Rubio & Rolán, 2014
Anticlimax reinaudi Rubio & Rolán, 2014
Anticlimax religiosa Rubio & Rolán, 2014
Anticlimax rhinoceros Rubio & Rolán, 2014
Anticlimax robusta Rubio & Rolán, 2014
Anticlimax serrata Rubio & Rolán, 2014
Anticlimax simplex Rubio & Rolán, 2014
Anticlimax simplicissima Rubio & Rolán, 2014
Anticlimax simulans Rubio & Rolán, 2014
Anticlimax singularis Rubio & Rolán, 2014
Anticlimax solomonensis Rubio & Rolán, 2014
Anticlimax spiralis Rubio & Rolán, 2014
Anticlimax tamarae Rubio & Rolán, 2014
Anticlimax tentorii Rubio & Rolán, 2014
Anticlimax textilis Rubio & Rolán, 2014
Anticlimax umbiliglabra Rubio & Rolán, 2014
Anticlimax uniformis Rubio & Rolán, 2014
Anticlimax vanuatuensis Rubio & Rolán, 2014
Anticlimax virginiae Rubio & Rolán, 2014
Eunaticina abyssalis Simone,2014
Microlinices apiculus Simone, 2014
Microlinices benthovus Simone, 2014
Microlinices gaiophanis Simone, 2014
Microlinices ibitingus Simone, 2014
Microlinices latiusculus Simone, 2014
Microlinices ombratus Simone, 2014
Natica jukyriuva Simone, 2014
Natica pipoca Simone, 2014

Neogastropoda

Aforia serranoi Gofas, Kantor & Luque, 2014
Africonus antoniaensis Cossignani & Fiadeiro, 2014
Africonus antonioi Cossignani, 2014
Africonus bernardinoi Cossignani, 2014
Africonus cabraloi Cossignani, 2014
Africonus cagarralensis Cossignani, 2014
Africonus calhetinensis Cossignani & Fiadeiro, 2014
Africonus condei Afonso & Tenorio, 2014
Africonus cossignanii Cossignani & Fiadeiro, 2014
Africonus diegoi Cossignani, 2014
Africonus docensis Cossignani & Fiadeiro, 2014
Africonus fiadeiroi Tenorio, Afonso, Cunha & Rolán, 2014
Africonus gonsalensis Cossignani & Fiadeiro, 2014
Africonus gonsaloi Afonso & Tenorio, 2014
Africonus joserochoi Cossignani, 2014
Africonus marcocastellazzii Cossignani & Fiadeiro, 2014
Africonus morroensis Cossignani & Fiadeiro, 2014
Africonus nelsontiagoi Cossignani & Fiadeiro, 2014
Africonus salletae Cossignani, 2014
Africonus santanaensis Afonso & Tenorio, 2014
Africonus silviae Cossignani, 2014
Africonus swinneni Tenorio, Afonso, Cunha & Rolán, 2014
Africonus umbelinae Cossignani & Fiadeiro, 2014
Africonus wandae Cossignani, 2014
Africonus zinhoi Cossignani, 2014
Americoliva grovesi Petuch & R.F. Myers, 2014
Americoliva mcleani Petuch & R.F. Myers, 2014
Antillophos liui S.-Q. Zhang & S.-P. Zhang, 2014
Coltroconus henriquei Petuch & Myers, 2014
Conasprelloides coltrorum Petuch & Myers, 2014
Gradiconus honkerorum Petuch & Myers, 2014
Jaspidiconus arawak Petuch & Myers, 2014
Jaspidiconus berschaueri Petuch & Myers, 2014
Jaspidiconus ericmonnieri Petuch & Myers, 2014
Jaspidiconus herndli Petuch & Myers, 2014
Jaspidiconus ogum Petuch & Myers, 2014
Jaspidiconus poremskii Petuch & Myers, 2014
Jaspidiconus simonei Petuch & Myers, 2014
Lamniconus patriceae Petuch & Myers, 2014

Unassigned Caenogastropoda
 Alviniconcha adamantis S.B. Johnson, Warén, Tunnicliffe, Van Dover, Wheat, Schultz & Vrijenhoek, 2014
 Alviniconcha boucheti S.B. Johnson, Warén, Tunnicliffe, Van Dover, Wheat, Schultz & Vrijenhoek, 2014
 Alviniconcha kojimai S.B. Johnson, Warén, Tunnicliffe, Van Dover, Wheat, Schultz & Vrijenhoek, 2014
 Alviniconcha marisindica Okutani, 2014
 Alviniconcha strummeri S.B. Johnson, Warén, Tunnicliffe, Van Dover, Wheat, Schultz & Vrijenhoek, 2014
Fusceulima saturata Souza & Pimenta, 2014
Fusceulima toffee Souza & Pimenta, 2014

Marine Heterobranchia

Ammonicera mcleani Sartori & Bieler, 2014
Ammonicera mexicana Sartori & Bieler, 2014
Ammonicera sleursi Sartori & Bieler, 2014
Anteaeolidiella fijensis Carmona, Bhave, Salunkhe, Pola, Gosliner & Cervera, 2014
Anteaeolidiella ireneae Carmona, Bhave, Salunkhe, Pola, Gosliner & Cervera, 2014
Anteaeolidiella poshitra Carmona, Bhave, Salunkhe, Pola, Gosliner & Cervera, 2014
Pseudotorinia phorcysi Cavallari, Salvador & Simone, 2014
Roboastra ernsti Pola, Padula, Gosliner & Cervera, 2014
Roboastra nikolasi Pola, Padula, Gosliner & Cervera, 2014
Strobiligera delicata Pimenta & Fernandes, 2014
Tambja brasiliensis Pola, Padula, Gosliner & Cervera, 2014
Tambja crioula Pola, Padula, Gosliner & Cervera, 2014
Tambja kava Pola, Padula, Gosliner & Cervera, 2014

New genera
Aenigmula Golding, 2014
Arxellia Vilvens, Williams & Herbert, 2014
Carolesia Güller & Zelaya, 2014
Costatohelix Gründel & Hostettler, 2014 †
Falsamotrochus Gründel & Hostettler, 2014 † 
Laubetrochus Gründel & Hostettler, 2014 †
Microlinices Simone, 2014
Rasatomaria Pieroni & Nützel, 2014 †

Freshwater gastropods 
New species
 Arganiella tabanensis Boeters, Glöer & Pešić, 2014
 Belgrandiella bozidarcurcici Glöer & Pešić, 2014
 Bythinella istoka Glöer & Pešić, 2014
 Bythinella kazdaghensis Odabaşı & Georgiev, 2014
 Bythinella marici Glöer & Pešić, 2014
 Bythinella temelkovi Georgiev & Glöer, 2014
 Bythiospeum demattiai Glöer & Pešić, 2014
 Chilina cuyana Gutiérrez Gregoric, Ciocco & Rumi, 2014
 Chilina sanjuanina Gutiérrez Gregoric, Ciocco & Rumi, 2014
 Chirgisia alaarchaensis Glöer, Boeters & Pešić, 2014
 Clenchiella bicingulata Ponder, Fukuda & Hallan, 2014
 Clenchiella iriomotensis Ponder, Fukuda & Hallan, 2014
 Clenchiella varicosa Ponder, Fukuda & Hallan, 2014
 Coleglabra nordaustralis Ponder, Fukuda & Hallan, 2014
 Colenuda kessneri Ponder, Fukuda & Hallan, 2014
 Coliracemata clarkae Ponder, Fukuda & Hallan, 2014
 Coliracemata katurana Ponder, Fukuda & Hallan, 2014
 Coliracemata mortoni Ponder, Fukuda & Hallan, 2014
 Fluviopupa kessneri Ponder & Shea, 2014
 Iverakia hausdorfi Glöer & Pešić, 2014
 Kerkia kareli Beran, Bodon & Cianfanelli, 2014
 Plagigeyeria lukai Glöer & Pešić, 2014
 Pontohoratia smyri Vinarski, Palatov & Glöer, 2014
 Pseudamnicola goksunensis Glöer, Gürlek & Kara, 2014
 Pseudamnicola marashi Glöer, Gürlek & Kara, 2014
 Pseudamnicola merali Glöer, Gürlek & Kara, 2014
 Pyrgulopsis marilynae Hershler, Ratcliffe, Liu, Lang & Hay, 2014
 Pyrgulopsis similis Hershler, Ratcliffe, Liu, Lang & Hay, 2014
 Spiralix calida Corbella, Guillén, Prats, Tarruella & Alba, 2014
 Stenothyra gelasinosa apiosa Golding, 2014
 Stenothyra gelasinosa phrixa Golding, 2014
 Stenothyra gelasinosa gelasinosa Golding, 2014
 Stenothyra paludicola timorensis Golding, 2014
 Stenothyra paludicola topendensis Golding, 2014
 Tryonia santarosae Hershler, Landye, De la Maza-Benignos, Ornelas & Carson, 2014
 Zeteana ljiljanae Glöer & Pešić, 2014

New genera
 Chirgisia Glöer, Boeters & Pešić, 2014 
 Coleglabra Ponder, Fukuda & Hallan, 2014
 Colenuda Ponder, Fukuda & Hallan, 2014
 Coliracemata Ponder, Fukuda & Hallan, 2014
 Iverakia Glöer & Pešić, 2014
 Motsametia Vinarski, Palatov & Glöer, 2014
 Pontohoratia Vinarski, Palatov & Glöer, 2014
 Zeteana Glöer & Pešić, 2014

Land gastropods

New species

 Adelopoma paulistanum Martins & Simone, 2014
 Aegista diversifamilia Huang, Lee, Lin & Wu, 2014
 Albinaria caerulea kefalos Nordsieck, 2014
 Albinaria freytagi insularum Nordsieck, 2014
 Albinaria inauris hausdorfi Nordsieck, 2014
 Albinaria inauris podanii Nordsieck, 2014
 Albinaria ithomensis raehlei Nordsieck, 2014
 Albinaria munda milasensi Nordsieck, 2014
 Ambrosiella floreanae Miquel & Herrera, 2014
 Amphidromus laevus janetabbasae Parsons, 2014
 Amphidromus laevus nusleti Parsons, 2014
 Amphidromus naggsi Thach & Huber, 2014
 Angustopila huoyani Jochum, Slapnik & Páll-Gergely in Jochum, Slapnik, Kampschulte, Martels, Heneka & Páll-Gergely, 2014
 Arion luisae Borredà & Martínez-Orti, 2014
 Baudinella magna Criscione & Köhler, 2014
 Baudinella margaritata Criscione & Köhler, 2014
 Bensonella plicidens lakainguta Hwang, 2014
 Bostryx roselleus Miranda & Cuezzo, 2014
 Bradybaena virgo mongolia Wang & Zhou in Wang, Xiao, Zhou & Hwang, 2014
 Boysidia xianfengensis Zhang, Chen & Zhou, 2014
 Boysidia xiaoguanensis Zhang, Chen & Zhou, 2014
 Camaena liqianae Jiang, Wu & He, 2014
 Candidula arrabidensis Holyoak & Holyoak, 2014
 Candidula carrapateirensis Holyoak & Holyoak, 2014
 Candidula ponsulensis Holyoak & Holyoak, 2014
 Cardiotrachia bastionensis Criscione & Köhler, 2014
 Carinartemis striatus Siriboon & Panha in Siriboon, Sutcharit, Naggs, Rowson & Panha, 2014
 Carinartemis vesperus Siriboon & Panha in Siriboon, Sutcharit, Naggs, Rowson & Panha, 2014
 Charopa lafargei Vermeulen & Marzuki, 2014
 Chondrulopsina mojurumika Gaibnazarova & Pazilov in Gaibnazarova, Pazilov & Kychboev, 2014
 Cyclodontina tapuia Salvador & Simone, 2014
 Cyclophorus abditus Nantarat & Panha in Nantarat, Wade, Jeratthitiku, Sutcharit & Panha, 2014
 Discartemon afthonodontia Siriboon & Panha in Siriboon, Sutcharit, Naggs, Rowson & Panha, 2014
 Discartemon circulus Siriboon & Panha in Siriboon, Sutcharit, Naggs, Rowson & Panha, 2014
 Discartemon conicus Siriboon & Panha in Siriboon, Sutcharit, Naggs, Rowson & Panha, 2014
 Discartemon deprima Siriboon & Panha in Siriboon, Sutcharit, Naggs, Rowson & Panha, 2014
 Discartemon discadentus Siriboon & Panha in Siriboon, Sutcharit, Naggs, Rowson & Panha, 2014
 Discartemon discamaximus Siriboon & Panha in Siriboon, Sutcharit, Naggs, Rowson & Panha, 2014
 Discartemon epipedis Siriboon & Panha in Siriboon, Sutcharit, Naggs, Rowson & Panha, 2014
 Discartemon expandus Siriboon & Panha in Siriboon, Sutcharit, Naggs, Rowson & Panha, 2014
 Discartemon flavacandida Siriboon & Panha in Siriboon, Sutcharit, Naggs, Rowson & Panha, 2014
 Discartemon kotanensis Siriboon & Panha in Siriboon, Sutcharit, Naggs, Rowson & Panha, 2014
 Discartemon megalostraka Siriboon & Panha in Siriboon, Sutcharit, Naggs, Rowson & Panha, 2014
 Discartemon triancus Siriboon & Panha in Siriboon, Sutcharit, Naggs, Rowson & Panha, 2014
 Eucalodium aglacyma Thompson, 2014
 Eucalodium arduum Thompson, 2014
 Eucalodium cervinus Thompson, 2014
 Eucalodium comalapense Thompson, 2014
 Eucalodium cyclops Thompson, 2014
 Eucalodium erugatum Thompson, 2014
 Eucalodium eurystoma Thompson, 2014
 Eucalodium filicostatum Thompson, 2014
 Eucalodium huehuetenangoense Thompson, 2014
 Eucalodium obesum Thompson, 2014
 Eucalodium slapcinskyi Thompson, 2014
 Eucalodium smithi Thompson, 2014
 Euryauchenia demangei dextroversa Nordsieck, 2014
 Gudeodiscus marmoreus Páll-Gergely in Páll-Gergely & Asami, 2014 
 Gulella proxima Van Bruggen, 2014
 Hemicycla idairae Verbinnen & Swinnen, 2014
 Hypselostoma kentingensis Hwang, 2014
 Indoartemon medius Siriboon & Panha in Siriboon, Sutcharit, Naggs, Rowson & Panha, 2014
 Insulivitrina raquelae Valido, Yanes, Alosno & Ibáñez, 2014
 Janulus traviesus Castro, Yanes, García, Alonso & Ibáñez, 2014
 Kimberleytrachia jacksonensis Criscione & Köhler, 2014
 Kimberleytrachia leopardus Criscione & Köhler, 2014
 Kimberleytrachia nelsonensis Criscione & Köhler, 2014
 Kimberleytrachia serrata Criscione & Köhler, 2014
 Kimberleytrachia setosa Criscione & Köhler, 2014
 Kimberleytrachia silvaepluvialis Criscione & Köhler, 2014
 Laotia christahemmenae Páll-Gergely, 2014
Leiostracus faerie Salvador & Cavallari, 2014
Leiostracus fetidus Salvador & Cavallari, 2014 
 Mautodontha domaneschii Sartori, Gargominy & Fontaine, 2014
 Mautodontha virginiae Sartori, Gargominy & Fontaine, 2014
 Mautodontha harperae Sartori, Gargominy & Fontaine, 2014
 Mautodontha aurora Sartori, Gargominy & Fontaine, 2014
 Mautodontha occidentalis Sartori, Gargominy & Fontaine, 2014
 Mautodontha temaoensis Sartori, Gargominy & Fontaine, 2014
 Mautodontha makateaensis Sartori, Gargominy & Fontaine, 2014
 Mautodontha passosi Sartori, Gargominy & Fontaine, 2014
 Mautodontha spelunca Sartori, Gargominy & Fontaine, 2014
 Megalobulimus jaguarunensis Fontenelle, Cavallari & Simone, 2014
 Mirus jejuensis Park, 2014
 Molema tenuicostata Criscione & Köhler, 2014
 Kleokyphus cowiei Sartori, Gargominy & Fontaine, 2014
 Parachloritis afranio Köhler & Kessner, 2014
 Parachloritis atauroensis Köhler & Kessner, 2014
 Parachloritis baucauensis Köhler & Kessner, 2014
 Parachloritis herculea Köhler & Kessner, 2014
 Parachloritis laritame Köhler & Kessner, 2014
 Parachloritis malukuensis Köhler & Kessner, 2014
 Parachloritis manuelmendesi Köhler & Kessner, 2014
 Parachloritis mundiperdidi Köhler & Kessner, 2014
 Parachloritis ninokonisi Köhler & Kessner, 2014
 Parachloritis nusatenggarae Köhler & Kessner, 2014
 Parachloritis pseudolandouria Köhler & Kessner, 2014
 Parachloritis ramelau Köhler & Kessner, 2014
 Parachloritis reidi Köhler & Kessner, 2014
 Parachloritis renschi Köhler & Kessner, 2014
 Parachloritis sylvatica Köhler & Kessner, 2014
 Paradoxipoma enigmaticum Watters, 2014
 Plectostoma davisoni Liew, Vermeulen, Marzuki & Schilthuizen, 2014
 Plectostoma dindingensis Liew, Vermeulen, Marzuki & Schilthuizen, 2014
 Plectostoma ikanensis Liew, Vermeulen, Marzuki & Schilthuizen, 2014
 Plectostoma kakiense Liew, Vermeulen, Marzuki & Schilthuizen, 2014
 Plectostoma kayiani Liew, Vermeulen, Marzuki & Schilthuizen, 2014
 Plectostoma kubuensis Liew, Vermeulen, Marzuki & Schilthuizen, 2014
 Plectostoma mengaburensis Liew, Vermeulen, Marzuki & Schilthuizen, 2014
 Plectostoma relauensis Liew, Vermeulen, Marzuki & Schilthuizen, 2014
 Plectostoma tenggekensis Liew, Vermeulen, Marzuki & Schilthuizen, 2014
 Plectostoma tohchinyawi Liew, Vermeulen, Marzuki & Schilthuizen, 2014
 Phuphania costata Tumpeesuwan & Tumpeesuwan, 2014
 Pseudolibera solemi Sartori, Gargominy & Fontaine, 2014
 Pseudolibera matthieui Sartori, Gargominy & Fontaine, 2014
 Pseudolibera cookei Sartori, Gargominy & Fontaine, 2014
 Pseudolibera aubertdelaruei Sartori, Gargominy & Fontaine, 2014
 Pseudolibera extincta Sartori, Gargominy & Fontaine, 2014
 Pseudolibera paraminderae Sartori, Gargominy & Fontaine, 2014
 Pseudolibera elieporoii Sartori, Gargominy & Fontaine, 2014
 Pseudolibera parva Sartori, Gargominy & Fontaine, 2014
 Pterocyclos diluvium Sutcharit & Panha in Sutcharit, Tonkerd & Panha, 2014
 Pterocyclos frednaggsi Sutcharit & Panha in Sutcharit, Tonkerd & Panha, 2014
 Pupilla kyrostriata Walther & Hausdorf, 2014
 Rachita carltonensis Criscione & Köhler, 2014
 Rhagada abbasi Köhler, 2014
 Rhagada setzeri atauroensis Köhler, 2014
 Raphaulus tonkinensis Páll-Gergely, 2014
 Retroterra dichroma Criscione & Köhler, 2014
 Retroterra nana Criscione & Köhler, 2014
 Satsuma wenshini Wu & Tsai, 2014
 Sicradiscus vargabalinti Páll-Gergely in Páll-Gergely & Asami, 2014 
 Tandonia bolensis De Mattia & Nardi, 2014
 Taurinellushka babugana Balashov, 2014<ref name=" Balashov">{{cite journal | last1 = Balashov | first1 = I | year = 2014 | title = Taurinellushka babugana gen. nov., sp. nov. (Stylommatophora: Pristilomatinae) from the Crimean Mountains (Ukraine) and revision of Crimean Mediterranea (Oxychilinae) | journal = Journal of Conchology | volume = 41 | issue = 5| pages = 575–584 }}</ref>
 Vermetum tamadabaensis Holyoak, Holyoak, Yanes, Santana, García, Castro, Artiles, Alonso & Ibáñez, 2014 
 Vitrea ulrichi Georgiev & Dedov, 2014
 Zilchistrophia hilaryae Páll-Gergely in Páll-Gergely & Asami, 2014 
 Zilchistrophia shiwiarorum Páll-Gergely in Páll-Gergely & Asami, 2014 

New genera
 Cardiotrachia Criscione & Köhler, 2014
 Eucalodium (Bradyplax) Thompson, 2014
 Carinartemis Siriboon & Panha in Siriboon, Sutcharit, Naggs, Rowson & Panha, 2014
 Paradoxipoma Watters, 2014
 Rachita Criscione & Köhler, 2014
 Taurinellushka'' Balashov, 2014

See also 
 List of gastropods described in 2013
 List of gastropods described in 2015

References 

Gastropods